Kanchanpur 2 one of three parliamentary constituencies of Kanchanpur District in Nepal. This constituency came into existence on the Constituency Delimitation Commission (CDC) report submitted on 31 August 2017.

Incorporated areas 
Kanchanpur 2 incorporates Krishnapur Municipality, Shuklaphanta Municipality and wards 1–7, 9 and 10 of Bedkot Municipality.

Assembly segments 
It encompasses the following Sudurpashchim Provincial Assembly segment

 Kanchanpur 2(A)
 Kanchanpur 2(B)

Members of Parliament

Parliament/Constituent Assembly

Provincial Assembly

2(A)

2(B)

Election results

Election in the 2020s

2022 general election

Election in the 2010s

2017 legislative elections

2017 Nepalese provincial elections

2(A)

2(B)

2013 Constituent Assembly election

Election in the 2000s

2008 Constituent Assembly election

Election in the 1990s

1999 legislative elections

1994 legislative elections

1991 legislative elections

See also 

 List of parliamentary constituencies of Nepal

References

External links 

 Constituency map of Kanchanpur

Parliamentary constituencies of Nepal
Constituencies established in 1991
1991 establishments in Nepal
Kanchanpur District